Giovanni Battista Manna (born circa 1570) was an Italian painter and poet.

He was born in Catania, but after youthful training in his native town, moved to Rome. There he also branched out into writing poetic pastorals and idylls, including Licandro, a tragicomic pastoral play. He became a member of the following learned societies, such as the Accademia degli Umoristi in Rome, degli Oziosi in Naples, and the degli Riacessi of Palermo.

References

16th-century Italian painters
Italian male painters
17th-century Italian painters
17th-century Italian poets
17th-century Italian male writers
Year of birth unknown
Year of death unknown
Artists from Catania
Year of birth uncertain